Phương Sơn is a commune (xã) and village in Lục Nam District, Bắc Giang Province, in northeastern Vietnam.

References

Populated places in Bắc Giang province
Communes of Bắc Giang province